Carl August Lebschée (1800–1877) was a German a painter, etcher, and lithographer, born at Schmiegel (modern Śmigiel), Poland. He studied at Munich, where his parents settled in 1807. He painted landscapes and architecture in oil and watercolours, and designed in the style of different masters. His etchings are executed with great spirit, and he signed with the initials C. L., or a monogram. He died in Munich.

References
 

1800 births
1877 deaths
People from Śmigiel
People from the Province of Posen
19th-century German painters
German male painters
Burials at the Alter Nordfriedhof (Munich)
German etchers
19th-century German male artists